Francis Hoddinott (29 November 1894 – November 1980), also known as Tom Hoddinott, was a Welsh association footballer. As well as being a professional footballer, he also boxed professionally in the 1920s.

Career

Born in Brecon, Hoddinott started his career in the Southern League with Aberdare Athletic, before moving to reigning Southern League champions Watford in 1919. Hoddinott's opportunities were limited in 1919–20; he played 13 of Watford's 43 fixtures, scoring 7 goals. Watford joined the Football League the following season. Hoddinott finished it as Watford's top scorer with 25 goals in all competitions. Additionally, he became the first player in Watford's history to earn international caps whilst at the club, and at the end of the season was sold to Chelsea for a fee of £3,500; higher than anything Watford had previously received.

However, Hoddinott was unable to maintain the form he had shown at Watford, scoring only 4 goals in 31 Chelsea league matches. He subsequently joined Crystal Palace in 1923, Rhyl in 1926 and New Brighton in 1927. Towards the end of his playing career, Hoddinott player-managed Newark Town and Grantham Town, before joining Chelmsford City as a coach in 1933.

References

1894 births
1980 deaths
Sportspeople from Brecon
Welsh footballers
Southern Football League players
English Football League players
Aberdare Athletic F.C. players
Watford F.C. players
Chelsea F.C. players
Crystal Palace F.C. players
Rhyl F.C. players
New Brighton A.F.C. players
Grantham Town F.C. players
Grantham Town F.C. managers
Wales international footballers
Welsh male boxers
Newark Town F.C. players
Association football forwards
Welsh football managers